Pterostylis coccina, commonly known as the scarlet greenhood, is a species of orchid endemic to eastern Australia. As with similar greenhoods, the flowering plants differ from those which are not flowering. The non-flowering plants have a rosette of leaves flat on the ground but the flowering plants have a single flower with leaves on the flowering spike. In this species, the rosette leaves are relatively large and dark green, and the flowers are white, and bluish-green or red. It grows in New South Wales and north-eastern Victoria.

Description
Pterostylis coccina is a terrestrial, perennial, deciduous, herb with an underground tuber and when not flowering, a rosette of two to five egg-shaped, flat, dark green leaves, each leaf 15–30 mm long and 10–15 mm wide. Flowering plants have a single flower 40–50 mm long and 16–19 mm wide borne on a spike 80–220 mm high with between three and five stem leaves. The flowers are white and bluish-green or white and red and lean forwards. The dorsal sepal and petals are fused, forming a hood or "galea" over the column. The dorsal sepal curves forward with a thread-like tip 12–16 mm long. The lateral sepals are held closely against the galea, have erect, thread-like tips 35–45 mm long and a relatively flat, slightly protruding sinus between their bases. The labellum is 20–25 mm long, about 4 mm wide, reddish-brown, blunt, and curved and protrudes beyond the sinus. Flowering occurs from January to April.

Taxonomy and naming
Pterostylis coccina was first formally described in 1878 by Robert FitzGerald and the description was published in Fitzgerald's book, Australian Orchids. The specific epithet (coccina) is a Latin word meaning "red like a berry" or "scarlet".

Distribution and habitat
The scarlet greenhood grows in grassy forest on the higher areas of New South Wales south from Mount Kaputar to north-eastern Victoria.

References

coccina
Endemic orchids of Australia
Orchids of New South Wales
Orchids of Victoria (Australia)
Plants described in 1878